The Latvia national under-19 speedway team is the national under-19 motorcycle speedway team of Latvia and is controlled by the Latvian Motorcyclists Federation (LaMSF). The team never qualify to the Team Speedway Junior European Championship Final. In the Individual competition silver medal was won by Ķasts Poudžuks in 2005.

Competition

Riders 
Riders who started in Individual Speedway Junior European Championship Finals:

Leonīds Paura (2002 - 13th)
 Ķasts Poudžuks (2002 - track reserve, 2004 - 5th, 2005 - 2nd)
 Maksims Bogdanovs (2005 - 17th, 2007 - 12th)
 Jevgēņijs Karavackis (2009 - 10th)

See also 
 Latvia national speedway team
 Latvia national under-21 speedway team

External links 
 (lv) Latvian Motorcyclists Federation webside

National speedway teams
Speedway
Team